The Mystery of a Hansom Cab is a re-issue in 1935 of the 1925 Australian silent film of the same name based on the 1886 novel The Mystery of a Hansom Cab by Fergus Hume. It was released by Pathescope.

References

1936 films
Films based on British novels
British black-and-white films